Ågot Gjems Selmer, also Ågot Gjems-Selmer, (27 October 1857 – 25  September 1926) was a Norwegian actress, writer, and lecturer.

Biography
Gjems-Selmer was born into a wealthy family in Kongsvinger, Norway. She was  the eldest of nine siblings born to Svend Jørgen Gjems and Johanne Rolfsen. As a 12-year-old, the family relocated to Kristiania (now Oslo). She graduated in 1876 she decided to become an actor. In 1883, she married  physician, Alfred Selmer (1851–1919) who became the first resident district physician in Balsfjord in the Tromsø region of Norway. After nineteen years, they moved to Ås in Akershus. They had eight children, five reaching adulthood, including the singer Tordis Gjems Selmer (1886–1964), actor  Alfred Gjems Selmer (1893–1919), and actor and writer Lillemor von Hanno (1900–1984).

While working as an actress, Gjems-Selmer performed at the Christiania Theatre, where in 1883, she played the role of Petra in the staging of Henrik Ibsen's An Enemy of the People, attracting critical acclaim.

She wrote a total of ten books, some translated into several languages including German, Dutch and Hungarian. Some were based on memories of her own childhood in Kongsvinger. These included Da mor var liten (When Mother was Little), describing how she became acquainted with Norwegian cultural celebrities including Jonas Lie, Bjørnstjerne Bjørnson, Ole Bull, Aasmund Olavsson Vinje and Erik Werenskiold. Later, when she and her husband lived in Balsfjord  for 19 years, her wrote about family life in the far north. One of her works was published in Germany (with several reprints) as Die Docktorsfamilie im Hohen Norden (The Doctor's Family in the Far North).

While Gjems-Selmer was not among the leading Norwegian authors of her day, she was a recognized female intellectual and a useful source of detailed information. She was also active in the area of women's rights, supporting votes for women.

After both her husband and their son  died in 1919, she retired to Villa Soleglad at Ås in Akershus where she died in 1926.

Selected works
 Smaapigernes bog (1900)
 Et hjem for mennesker: en Menneskeskildring i tre Handlinger (1901)
 Da mor var liden (1902)
 Kvinderne i Bjørnsons digtning. Essay (1907)
 Lillemor - (1911)
 Den gang -. Af mit livs digt (1915)
 Mor fortæller (1915)

References

Other sources
Lill-Karin Elvestad (2019) Ågot Gjems Selmer (1857-1926) 	(Orkana Akademisk) 

1858 births
1926 deaths
People from Kongsvinger
19th-century Norwegian actresses
Norwegian children's writers
Norwegian women children's writers
20th-century Norwegian writers
20th-century Norwegian actresses
20th-century Norwegian women writers
Norwegian stage actresses